Plano is an unincorporated community in Ashland Township, Morgan County, in the U.S. state of Indiana.

History
A post office was established at Plano in 1889, and remained in operation until it was discontinued in 1904.

Geography

References

Unincorporated communities in Morgan County, Indiana
Unincorporated communities in Indiana
Indianapolis metropolitan area